The 85th Indianapolis 500 (aka “the 2001 Indianapolis 500”) was held at the Indianapolis Motor Speedway in Speedway, Indiana on Sunday, May 27, 2001. Race rookie Hélio Castroneves, a three-year veteran of the CART series, led the final 52 laps and won his first of four Indy 500 victories. Penske Racing swept 1st-2nd with Gil de Ferran the runner-up. Winning car owner Roger Penske scored his 11th victory at the Indianapolis 500, and his first-ever 1-2 finish in the race. It was a redemption from the team's previous attempt at Indy (1995) in which both of his cars failed to qualify; subsequently followed by a five-year absence (1996-2000) due to the open wheel "split."

The race was sanctioned by the Indy Racing League, and was part of the 2001 Indy Racing Northern Lights Series season. The 2001 race was notable in that several top CART teams returned to Indy for the first time since 1995, despite the ongoing open wheel "split." IRL-based teams excelled in time trials, taking the front row, and the top four starting positions overall. However, the CART-based teams swept the top six finishing positions on race day.

The race experienced two rain delays, one lengthy yellow flag around the midway point, and one brief red flag period later in the day. The race, however, was run to its full 500-mile distance.

This race marked the final IndyCar race for the previous years championship runner-up Scott Goodyear. Goodyear would move to color commentary duties for ESPN the following season.

Changes for 2001
In the seventh year of the IRL/CART split, Team Penske and Team Green purchased IRL-type machines, and returned to race at Indianapolis. Ganassi, who had returned in 2000, entered as well. For the first time during the open wheel split, the CART series did not schedule any races for the weekend of Indy 500 pole qualifying, nor the race itself, to allow their teams the opportunity to participate at Indy without interference.

Because of his move to Formula One for the 2001 season, reigning Indianapolis 500 champion Juan Pablo Montoya did not return to defend his title. After one year of retirement, two-time winner Arie Luyendyk returned to the cockpit.

After an experimental two-week schedule was used for the Indy 500 from 1998–2000, the Speedway reverted to the more traditional three-week schedule for practice, time trials, and the race. Rookie orientation was held April 13–14. Time trials were set at three days, however, instead of the original four. The week-long open test held in April from 1998-2000 was also eliminated, essentially replaced by the reinstatement of the second week of May practice.

Due to the MSA, tobacco brand sponsorship was an issue during the month of May. Penske Racing drivers Hélio Castroneves and Gil de Ferran were sponsored by Marlboro full-time in the CART series. The MSA, however, allows brand sponsorship in only one sport per season. To skirt the regulations, CART sanctioned the participation of its teams in the race. The Penske cars practiced and qualified with Marlboro logos during the first week of activity. By mid-month, however, they were required to remove the logos when the state attorney general's office objected to their use. Rather than repaint the liveries, or add generic logos, the sidepods were simply left blank with the familiar white/red Marlboro paint scheme maintained.

Rule changes
During yellow flag caution periods, the "wave around" rule would now be implemented. When the field is one lap away from going back to green flag conditions, all lapped cars behind the pace car that happen to be ahead of the actual race leader would be waved around the pace car, get their lap back, and be permitted to catch up to the tail end of the line of cars. This would continue until the race leader became the first car behind the pace car. Following the precedent set in 2000, the pace car would then drop off the track in turn one, and the race leader would pace the field back to the green flag and the ensuring restart.

The new restart rules were an attempt to ensure the leaders would get back to green flag racing without interference from lapped cars. It also created a strategy for lapped cars to earn one lap back (ostensibly by not pitting under a caution flag while all of the leader do), since Indy car racing had never allowed "racing back to the caution", nor did they want to implement a hard rule like the "Lucky Dog" in NASCAR.

Race schedule

Practice
IRL regular Greg Ray led practice speeds for four of the first six days. Casey Mears, Eliseo Salazar, and Stan Wattles suffered crashes during the week. On Fast Friday, Indy 500 rookie Hélio Castroneves brushed the wall in turn one, but continued. The car suffered minor damage. Later that evening, Castroneves joked around with track workers, and helped them repaint the retaining wall which he had hit.

Time trials
Tony Stewart led the speed chart for morning practice on pole day, but IRL regular Scott Sharp won the battle for the pole position with a run above 226MPH in the heat of the day.  Greg Ray, who had been among the fastest cars all week, qualified second with a run late after waving off earlier in the day while Robby Gordon, driving an Indy-only entry for AJ Foyt Racing, rounded out the front row.  The highest of the CART qualifiers was Gil de Ferran (5th). Former Indy 500 winners Arie Luyendyk, Buddy Lazier, Al Unser Jr., and Eddie Cheever also made the field on pole day.  At the end of pole day the field was filled to 27 cars.

On the second day of qualifying, veterans Michael Andretti, Eddie Cheever, and Buzz Calkins withdrew their slow times from pole day and re-qualified safely while rookie Bruno Junqueira was the fastest of the day.  At the end of second day qualifying there were 32 cars in the field.

On bump day, Billy Boat was the first car to complete a qualifying attempt, and the field was subsequently filled to 33 cars. Six cars were bumped during the afternoon, and Boat dropped to the bubble spot as of 5:07 p.m. Over the final 53 minutes Boat survived 12 attempts to be bumped from the field. Eight cars waved off, and four were too slow. With 10 seconds to go before the 6 o'clock gun, Memo Gidley was the final driver to make a qualifying attempt. He missed bumping his way into the field by 0.242 seconds.

Starting grid

Alternates
First alternate:  Shigeaki Hattori (#55)
Second alternate:  Memo Gidley   (#37)

Failed to qualify
 #07  Roberto Guerrero
 #32  Didier André 
 #94  Stan Wattles
 #30  Brandon Erwin  - Replaced by Jimmy Kite
 #60  Tyce Carlson
 #30  Jimmy Kite
 #25  Casey Mears

Race recap

Start
Race morning was overcast with rain in the forecast. Cool temperatures caused problems at the start, as pole sitter Scott Sharp crashed in the first turn on the first lap. Greg Ray and Robby Gordon barely avoided the crash, and slipped by the lead the field around for the first several laps.

On the 6th lap, the green came out, but less than 2 laps later, another crash occurred. Sarah Fisher spun in turn two, and collected Scott Goodyear. Both cars were heavily damaged, and Goodyear suffered a broken back. Goodyear would retire after the race due to the injury.

After a lengthy yellow, the green came out on lap 17. During the restart, however, cold tires caused yet another crash, as Sam Hornish Jr. spun in turn four. Hornish did not hit anything, but Al Unser Jr. moved high to avoid the crash, and brushed along the outside wall on the main stretch.

First half and First rain delay
The race finally got going on lap 22, with Robby Gordon and Greg Ray dominating the early going. A long stretch of green flag racing saw the leaders cycle through two green flag pit stops.
On lap 107, Jon Herb crashed in turn 1. During the yellow, rain began to fall around the track, and the caution was extended until lap 119. Michael Andretti led when the rain fell, but pitted soon after. Gil de Ferran inherited the lead, Team Penske teammate Hélio Castroneves second.

Second half and Second rain delay
On lap 134, Cory Witherill spun exiting turn four. The leaders all headed to the pits. 
Castroneves and de Ferran were both penalized for exiting out of the pits incorrectly, giving Tony Stewart the lead for the first time of the day.
Stewart led until rain fell again on lap 149. After Stewart pitted, Hélio Castroneves retook the lead. Rain began falling harder on lap 155, and the red flag was displayed. After about 10 minutes, the sun came out, and the track quickly dried. After a 17-minute red flag, the cars were refired.

Finish
Hélio Castroneves led Robbie Buhl on the restart. Buhl attempted to take the lead on lap 159, but was blocked. Trailing by less than a half-second on lap 166, Buhl suddenly spun exiting turn 2, and tapped the inside wall.

The green came back out on lap 171, with Castroneves still leading, and de Ferran back to second. Castroneves held off his teammate by 0.4838 seconds, and won his first Indy 500. The finish marked Roger Penske's 11th Indy 500 triumph, and his first 1-2 finish. It was the second rookie winner in a row (following Juan Pablo Montoya in 2000).

On the victory lap, Castroneves stopped at the finish line, climbed from his car, and proceeded to engage in his customary celebration of climbing the catch fence, much to the delight of the fans. Several crew members from Team Penske joined him on the fence.

In a public relations setback for the IRL, the top six finishers were all visiting drivers from the rival CART series.  The first regular IRL series driver to finish was Eliseo Salazar in seventh place, running a lap down.

Scott Sharp's crash on the first lap meant for the second year in a row, the pole sitter finished 33rd and last.  In the previous year's race, the same fate had befallen Greg Ray.

The 1-2 result for Team Penske provided a stunning comeback for the most successful team in Indianapolis 500 history after their failure to qualify for the 1995 race, the last Indy 500 entered by Team Penske due to the Indy 500 becoming an IRL race from 1996 onward.  "I think we redeemed ourselves for the lousy thing we did in 1995 ... this is the best day of my life coming back like this" said Roger Penske in pit lane immediately after Castroneves took the checkered flag.

Tony Stewart does Double Duty
Tony Stewart attempted the Indy/Charlotte "Double Duty" for the second time in his racing career. Criticized by members of the media as being overweight and unfit for the grueling task, Stewart undertook a month-long fitness and dietary program with a personal trainer. Stewart, still driving the #20 The Home Depot-sponsored Pontiac for Joe Gibbs Racing in the NASCAR Winston Cup Series, signed with Chip Ganassi Racing, part of a four driver effort at Indy.

Stewart qualified in 7th at Indy and 12th at Charlotte. Due to the new television package on Fox, the start of the Coca-Cola 600 was moved up. A strict schedule was put into place, and regardless if the race was not over at Indy, Stewart was allegedly required to get out of the car at 4:00 p.m. to fly to Charlotte on time. During a 17-minute red flag, he had to visit first aid for a cramping leg. Relief driver Richie Hearn almost took over, but Stewart got back in the car.

The race was eventually resumed, and Stewart continued. The race was completed, and he finished 6th, on the lead lap. Immediately he flew to Lowe's Motor Speedway, and made the start of the race on time. He was moved to the back of the pack during the pace lap for missing the drivers' meeting. On the second lap, Stewart spun while running last, in an incident he claimed was unrelated to fatigue. As the race wore on, he steadily climbed the standings, and finished 3rd on the lead lap. He became the first driver ever to complete all . Feeling that he proved his critics wrong, Stewart called them "idiots."

National anthem controversy

For the pre-race ceremonies, the Speedway invited Steven Tyler of Aerosmith to perform "The Star-Spangled Banner." At the time, Aerosmith was kicking off their Just Push Play Tour, and in the days leading up to the race, struck a deal with Heritage Motorsports to sponsor Jeff Ward's car during the race. The performance was widely regarded by observers as one of the worst and most controversial renditions of the U.S. national anthem ever.

The national anthem performer at the Indianapolis 500 is normally backed-up by the Purdue All-American Marching Band; however, the band was only allowed to play the opening chorus. Tyler began the song with a harmonica solo, then tossed the instrument into the crowd. He finished the song a cappella. Tyler took artistic license to the extreme, and altered the last line of the song from "...the home of the brave" to "...the home of the Indianapolis 500." The crowd, television and radio commentators, along with military Medal of Honor recipients in attendance due to the Memorial Day holiday, had a largely negative response to the performance. Tyler apologized and stated he meant no disrespect. Said Tyler, "I'm very proud to be an American, and live in the home of the brave."

Speedway president Tony George released a statement the following Tuesday citing "While we are certainly sorry that some were offended, it was neither our intention nor that of Mr. Tyler to be disrespectful. All of us have the utmost respect for the sacrifice our veterans have made for us."

The harmonica Tyler threw into the crowd was reported to be retrieved by Purdue band member David Hornthal. On the February 20, 2012 episode of Pawn Stars, a harmonica purported to be the one Tyler threw into the crowd was presented, but did not sell.

Results

 = Former Indianapolis 500 winner;  = Indianapolis 500 rookie

*C Chassis: D=Dallara, G=G-Force

*E Engine: O=Oldsmobile, I=Infiniti

Broadcasting

Radio
The race was carried live on the Indy Racing Radio Network. Mike King served as chief announcer. Johnny Rutherford served as "driver expert" along with newcomer Johnny Parsons.

Several minor changes were made to the crew. Bob Lamey, Ken Double, and Larry Rice all departed. Kevin Lee joined the crew, taking the turn two position, which was now atop the Southeast Vista grandstand (it was previously on the roof of the VIP Suites). Chris Denari moved from the pits to turn four, where he remains as of today with the exception of 2014 when he was in Miami calling an Indiana Pacers playoff game. Howdy Bell took the limited assignment of hospital reporter and interviews during the pre-race coverage. The job of on-air "statistician" was eliminated permanently. Newcomers Adam Alexander and Kim Morris served as pit reporters along with Mike Lewis, who had debuted just one year earlier.

Starting in 2001, the flagship station for the network was changed back to its original home, 1070 WIBC-AM (now WFNI). Booth interviews were kept to a minimum in 2001. King interviewed Dr. Robert Hubbard, the 2001 co-recipient of the Louis Schwitzer Award for development of the HANS device.

Television
The race was carried live flag-to-flag coverage in the United States on ABC Sports. Al Michaels returned as host, with Bob Jenkins as announcer. Analyst Arie Luyendyk left television and returned to the cockpit. Tom Sneva left television as well. The new booth crew for 2001 included analysts Larry Rice and Jason Priestley.

Gary Gerould was not part of the 2001 broadcast. Instead he was taking part in the CART telecasts for the season. Vince Welch took his place as pit reporter, Welch's first time on television at Indy.

Notes

References

Works cited
2001 Indianapolis 500 Daily Trackside Report for the Media
Indianapolis 500 History: Race & All-Time Stats - Official Site

Indianapolis 500 races
Indianapolis 500
Indianapolis 500
Indianapolis 500
Indianapolis 500